Believe Me, Xantippe is a lost 1918 American silent romantic comedy film produced by Jesse Lasky for release through Paramount Pictures. The film was directed by actor/director Donald Crisp and stars Wallace Reid and Ann Little. The film is based on a 1913 William A. Brady-produced play Believe Me Xantippe by John Frederick Ballard, which on the Broadway stage had starred John Barrymore.

Plot
As described in a film magazine, George MacFarland (Reid) makes a bet with two of his friends that, having committed a forgery, he will be able to elude the officers of the law for one year. As his friends are very thorough, he does not find it an easy matter getting around town. He finally goes to a small town in the west where he lives unmolested for eleven months. On a hunting expedition he meets Dolly Kamman (Little), daughter of Sheriff Kamman (Beery), who takes George to meet her father. As Dolly has fallen in love with George's photograph, he is a somewhat privileged prisoner. On the day the bet is off George hears that his friends have drowned and he is sure he is to be sent to Sing Sing. The arrival of the boys, however, changes things, and in addition to being set free George wins Dolly.

Cast
Wallace Reid as George MacFarland (portrayed by John Barrymore on stage)
Ann Little as Dolly Kamman (portrayed by Mary Young on stage)
Ernest Joy as Thornton Brown
Henry Woodward as Arthur Sole
Noah Beery as Sheriff Kamman (portrayed by Theodore Roberts on stage)
James Cruze as Simp Calloway (portrayed by Frank Campeau on stage)
Winifred Greenwood as Violette
Jim Farley as Detective Thorne
Charles Ogle as Wren Wrigley
Clarence Geldart as William

See also
Xanthippe, wife of Socrates
Wallace Reid filmography

References

External links

lobby poster

1918 films
1918 romantic comedy films
American silent feature films
American romantic comedy films
American black-and-white films
Famous Players-Lasky films
American films based on plays
Films directed by Donald Crisp
Films set in Colorado
Paramount Pictures films
Lost American films
Lost romantic comedy films
1918 lost films
1910s American films
Silent romantic comedy films
Silent American comedy films